opened in Kitakyushu, Fukuoka Prefecture, Japan, in 2002.

See also
 Kitakyushu Municipal Museum of Art
 List of Historic Sites of Japan (Fukuoka)
 List of Cultural Properties of Japan - paintings (Fukuoka)
 List of Museums in Fukuoka Prefecture

References

External links
  Kitakyushu Museum of Natural History & Human History
  Kitakyushu Museum of Natural History & Human History

Museums in Fukuoka Prefecture
History museums in Japan
Natural history museums in Japan
Buildings and structures in Kitakyushu
Museums established in 2002
2002 establishments in Japan
Tourist attractions in Kitakyushu